Raj Bhavan (translation: Government House) is the official residence of the governor of Mizoram. It is located in the capital city of Aizawl, Mizoram.

See also
  Government Houses of the British Indian Empire
 List of governors of Mizoram

References

External links
Website

Governors' houses in India
Aizawl
Buildings and structures in Mizoram